is the current era of Japan's official calendar. It began on 1 May 2019, the day on which Emperor Akihito's elder son, Naruhito, ascended the throne as the 126th Emperor of Japan. The day before, Emperor Akihito abdicated the Chrysanthemum Throne, marking the end of the Heisei era. The Ministry of Foreign Affairs of Japan explained the meaning of Reiwa to be "beautiful harmony".

Background

Announcement 
The Japanese government on 1 April 2019 announced the name during a live televised press conference, as Chief Cabinet Secretary Yoshihide Suga traditionally revealed the kanji calligraphy on a board. The Prime Minister Shinzō Abe said that Reiwa represents "a culture being born and nurtured by people coming together beautifully".

Name selection 
A shortlist of names for the new era was drawn up by a nine-member expert panel comprising seven men and two women with the cabinet selecting the final name from the shortlist. The nine experts were:

  – professor at Chiba University of Commerce
  – former chief justice of the Supreme Court of Japan
  – Nobel prize-winning stem-cell scientist, professor at Kyoto University
  – screenwriter and novelist
  – former chairman of the Japan Business Federation
  – trustee and president of Waseda University
  – president of the Japan Newspaper Publishers and Editors Association
  – president of the Japan Broadcasting Corporation
  – president of Nippon Television Holdings

Official pronunciations and meanings of these names were not released, although the reading of Eikō was leaked; the other readings are speculative.

Origin and meaning 

The kanji characters for Reiwa are derived from the Man'yōshū, an eighth-century (Nara period) anthology of waka poetry. The kotobagaki (headnote) attached to a group of 32 poems (815–846) in Volume 5 of the collection, composed on the occasion of a poetic gathering to view the plum blossoms, reads as follows:

The Japanese Foreign Ministry provided an English-language interpretation of Reiwa as "beautiful harmony", to dispel reports that  here is translated as "command" or "order" – which are the significantly more common meanings of the character, especially so in both modern Japanese and Chinese. The Foreign Ministry also noted that "beautiful harmony" is rather an explanation than an official translation or a legally binding interpretation.

In addition, following the announcement of Reiwa in 2019, Susumu Nakanishi advocated for understanding the character  of the era name through the help of the Japanese word , stressing that in the traditional dictionaries (such as Erya or the Kangxi Dictionary), the word  is explained with the word . Nakanishi criticized the understanding of the 
 in Reiwa as Japanese , which was propagated by then-Prime Minister Shinzo Abe, pointing out that neither the etymology nor the exact sense are appropriate.

Novelty 

"Reiwa" marks the first Japanese era name with characters that were taken from Japanese literature instead of classic Chinese literature.

Robert Campbell, director-general of National Institute of Japanese Literature in Tokyo, provided an official televised interpretation to NHK, regarding the characters based on the poem, noting that "Rei" is an auspicious wave of energy of the plum blossoms carried by the wind, and "Wa", the general character of peace and tranquility.

Accordingly, the name marks the 248th era name designated in Japanese history. While the "wa" character  has been used in 19 previous era names, the "rei" character  has never appeared before.  The character appeared in a proposed era name in 1864—Reitoku—that the ruling Tokugawa shogunate rejected, as it could be interpreted as the emperor commanding (rei) the Tokugawa.

Implementation

Currency 
According to the Japan Mint, all coins with the new era name will be released by October 2019. It takes three months to make preparations such as creating molds in order to input text or pictures. The Mint will prioritize creating 100- and 500-yen coins due to their high mintage and circulation, with an anticipated release by the end of July 2019.

Technology 

The resulting new version of Unicode, 12.1.0, was released on 7 May 2019.

The Microsoft Windows update KB4469068 included support for the new era.

Events

On 19 November 2019, Shinzo Abe became the longest-serving prime minister of Japan and surpassed the previous 2,883-day record of Katsura Tarō. Abe also beat Eisaku Satō's 2,798 consecutive days record on 23 August 2020. He resigned for health reasons in September 2020 and was succeeded by Yoshihide Suga.

In early 2020, Japan began to suffer from the COVID-19 pandemic as several countries reported a significant increase in cases by March 2020. Japan and other countries donated masks, medical equipment, and money to China.

In June 2020, Fugaku was declared the most powerful supercomputer in the world with a performance of 415.53 PFLOPS. Fugaku also ranked first place in computational methods performance for industrial use, artificial intelligence applications, and big data analytics. It was co-developed by the RIKEN research institute and Fujitsu.

Despite COVID, the Tokyo Olympics went ahead in the summer of 2021, a year later than originally scheduled.

In September 2021, Suga announced he would not stand in the Liberal Democratic Party leadership election, effectively ending his term as prime minister. He was succeeded by Fumio Kishida who took office as prime minister on 4 October 2021. Kishida was elected leader of the ruling Liberal Democratic Party (LDP) a week prior. He was officially confirmed as the country's 100th prime minister following a parliamentary vote.

In March 2022, a strong offshore earthquake near Fukushima killed 4, injured hundreds, and damaged the Shinkansen line in Tohoku.

In July 2022, the former prime minister Shinzo Abe was assassinated by Tetsuya Yamagami in Nara. By comparison, Japan had only 10 gun related deaths from 2017 to 2021 and 1 gun fatality in 2021.

The 2022 Russian invasion of Ukraine caused Japan to join Western-led sanctions against Russia. Japan was the first Asian country to exert pressure on Russia.

On December 16, 2022, the Second Kishida Cabinet announced a departure from Japan's defense-oriented policy by acquiring counterstrike capabilities and a defense budget increase to 2% of GDP by 2027. This comes amidst growing security concerns over China, North Korea and Russia. This will make Japan the 3rd largest defense-spender (¥43 trillion ($315 billion) after the United States and China.

Conversion table
To convert any Gregorian calendar year since 2019 to Japanese calendar year in Reiwa era, subtract 2018 from the year in question.

See also
2019 in Japan
2020 in Japan
2021 in Japan
2022 in Japan
2023 in Japan

References

Externals links 

 Reiwa

2019 establishments in Japan
 
Japanese eras
2010s neologisms
2019 neologisms
2019 in Japan
2020s in Japan
2019 introductions